Susan Hannah Eakins ( Macdowell; September 21, 1851 – December 27, 1938) was an American painter and photographer. Her works were first shown at the Pennsylvania Academy of the Fine Arts, where she was a student. She won the Mary Smith Prize there in 1879 and the Charles Toppan prize in 1882. 

One of her teachers was the artist Thomas Eakins, who later became her husband. She made portrait and still life paintings. She was also known for her photography. 

After her husband died in 1916, Eakins became a prolific painter. Her works were exhibited in group exhibitions in her lifetime, though her first solo exhibition was held after she died.

Early life
She was the fifth of eight children of William H. Macdowell, a Philadelphia engraver and photographer, who also a skilled painter. He passed on to his three sons and five daughters his interest in Thomas Paine and freethought. Both Susan and her sister, Elizabeth, displayed early interest in art, which was encouraged by their father. Susan was given an attic studio for her artwork. Aside from her artistic talents, she was also a proficient pianist.

Education
She was 25 when she met Thomas Eakins at the Hazeltine Gallery where his painting The Gross Clinic was being exhibited in 1876. It was also shown at the Philadelphia Centennial Exposition. 

Unlike many, she was impressed by the controversial painting and she decided to study with him at the Pennsylvania Academy of the Fine Arts, which she attended for six years. At that time Pennsylvania Academy of the Fine Arts was considered the best art school in the United States. Before she studied with Eakins, she studied with Christian Schussele. Under Eakins, she adopted a style similar to her teacher's. She was the winner of the first Mary Smith Prize in 1879 for Portrait of a Gentleman and Dog.

Her sister, Elizabeth, studied at the academy beginning in 1876, too. Other female art students included Mary Cassatt, Cecilia Beaux, Emily Sartain, and Alice Barber Stephens. They received a good education in art, but were restricted from painting nude male models. During her time as a student, she became class secretary, during which time she pulled for inclusion of women artists in the life-drawing classes of nude models.

Marriage
She married Eakins in 1884. As director of the Pennsylvania Academy of the Fine Arts, Eakins had made the decision to use female and male nude models for the life studies classes for students of both genders. As a result of recriminations, he was asked to resign one year after their marriage. Even though he had support from some family and friends, it was a life-changing event that affected relationships in their lives and the Eakins' enthusiasm for life.

Eakins spent most of her time supporting her husband’s career, entertaining guests and students, and faithfully backing him in his difficult times with the Academy, even when some members of her family aligned against Eakins. The couple had no children.

Career
Eakins painted portraits, many of which included family members, and scenes of domestic life. Between 1876 and 1882, Eakins exhibited her work at the Pennsylvania Academy of the Fine Arts. While she was married, Eakins only painted sporadically. Both had separate studios in their home. She shared a passion for photography with her husband, both as photographers and subjects, and employed it as a tool for their art. She also posed nude for many of his photos and took images of him. In 1898 she became a member and exhibited her works at the Philadelphia Photographic Salon, including Child with Doll, one of her best photographs. She exhibited in 1905 at the Pennsylvania Academy of the Fine Arts.

Of her paintings, Thomas Eakins said of her that she was more adept with color than he and that she was "as good as a woman painter as he had ever seen." Susan Casteras, art historian, said of her Portrait of a Lady, made in 1880, that it showed her "firm handling and solid anatomical construction blended with generally dark tonalities."

After Thomas Eakin's death in 1916, she returned to painting, working nearly every day, adding considerably to her output. Her paintings were made in a style that became warmer, looser, and brighter in tone. In 1936 her works and those of her husband and sister Elizabeth were exhibited at the Philadelphia Art Club.

Death
She died December 27, 1938, in Philadelphia, Pennsylvania, after which her ashes were mixed with her husband's. The Eakins' ashes were buried in the Woodlands Cemetery in Philadelphia in an unmarked grave of her family's lot. A marker was installed in 1983 by an anonymous donor.

Legacy
It was not until 35 years after her death, in 1973, that she had her first major exhibition at the Pennsylvania Academy of the Fine Arts. In 1976, her work was included in the Nineteenth Century Women Artists exhibition at the Whitney Museum of American Art.

In September and October 1977, an exhibition was held of the photographs and paintings of Susan, her sister Elizabeth and husband Thomas in Roanoke, Virginia at the North Cross School.

Works
Her works included:

 Alfred Reynolds, oil on artist board, 1880-1900
 Anguish, oil, 1916
 Anna Hyatt Caldwell, oil. Mrs. Caldwell was the wife of Joseph Ralston Caldwell and died in 1935
 Artist and Model, oil
 Boy in Orange Shirt, oil
 Chaperone, watercolor on paper, 1879
 Child's Head, oil
 Clarence Cranmer, oil, 1920-1925
 Dancers, oil, 
 David Wilson Jordon, oil, Palmer Museum of Art, Pennsylvania State University
 Dora Adelman, oil, 1935
 Double Figure Study, oil
 Dr. William N. Bradley, oil, 1934
 Edward Coles (1786-1868), oil, 1883, Chicago Historical Society
 Fruit and Flower Arrangement, oil, 
 Gentleman and Dog, oil, 1878, Taubman Museum of Art, Roanoke, Virginia
 Girl in Yellow Blouse (seated), oil on canvas
 Girl in Yellow Blouse (standing), oil on canvas
 Girl Reading, oil, 
 Girl Reading, oil, 1925-1930
 Girls Head from the Rear, oil, 
 Grandfather Macdowell, oil, 1879
 Hannah Macdowell and Sister, oil, 1882
 Hannah Trimble Gardner Macdowell, oil, 1880-1885
 Joanna Wnukowska Kowalewski, oil, 1933
 Kate Lewis, oil, 1884, Allentown Art Museum
 Landscape, oil
 Lenore Adelman, oil, 1933
 Leroy Ireland, oil on canvas, 1910, Brooklyn Museum of Art
 Lewis Sisters (at home), oil, 1932
 Luigi Maratti, oil on canvas, 1932
 Margaret Eakins, watercolor, 
 Mrs. King, watercolor, 1879
 Murray with Barry Statue, watercolor on paper
 Music, oil on linen covered board, Pennsylvania Academy of the Fine Arts
 Old Fashioned Dress, oil, 1880
 Old Man, Portrait Sketch, oil, 
 Paul Crenshaw Physick, MD, oil, University of Pennsylvania
 Peonies, oil, 1925
 Pierre Menard, 1766 - 1844, oil on canvas, Chicago History Museum
 Portrait of a Bearded Man, oil, 1932, Kennedy Galleries, New York, New York
 Portrait of a Lady, oil, 1880
 Portrait of a Man, oil, 1920-1930
 Portrait of a Philadelphia Lady, 1890s
 Portrait of a Soldier, oil, 1917
 Portrait of a Woman, oil, 
 Portrait of Charles Bregler, oil on canvas, 1920s, Pennsylvania Academy of the Fine Arts
 Portrait of David Wilson Jordan, oil,  Palmer Museum of Art, Pennsylvania State University
 Portrait of Thomas Eakins s, oil, Philadelphia Museum of Art
 Reflections, oil, 1881
 Roseanna Williams, oil on wood panel, 1879, Pennsylvania Academy of the Fine Arts
 Roseanna Williams, watercolor, 1879 
 Sculptor and Model, oil, 1924
 Seated Girl in Tunic, oil, 1920-1930
 Seated Old Woman Reading, oil
 Spinning, watercolor, 
 Still Life, oil, 
 Still Life: Dish, Vegetable and Fruit, oil
 Study of Cello Player, oil, 
 Study of a Man
 Study of Susan, oil
 Susan and Elizabeth Macdowell (self-portrait), oil, 1879
 Susan and Elizabeth Macdowell (self-portrait), oil, 1910-1920
 Susan and Elizabeth Macdowell (self-portrait), oil, 1925
 Susan Hannah Macdowell Eakins (self-portrait as a child), oil, after 1861
 Susan Hannah Macdowell Eakins (self-portrait), oil, private collection
 Tennis Player, oil, 1933
 The Bibliophile, oil, 1932
 The Spinners (Three Fates), oil on masonite
 Thomas Cadwalader, 1795 - 1873, oil, 1882
 Thomas Cowperthwaite Eakins, oil, 
 Thomas Eakins Working at an Easel, oil on board, early to mid 1880s, Pennsylvania Academy of the Fine Arts
 Two Ladies and Dog, oil, 
 Two Sisters, oil on canvas, 1879
 Unidentified Girl, oil, 
 Unidentified Man, oil, 1880-1900
 Unidentified Woman, oil
 Walter Gardner Macdowell, oil, 1880-1930
 Watchful Guardian, oil, 1878
 William H. Macdowell, Portrait Sketch oil, 1880-1881
 William H. Macdowell, oil, 1881
 William Pepper (1810-1864) oil, 1883, University of Pennsylvania
 Woman in a Plain Shawl, oil on canvas, 
 Woman in Profile, oil, 
 Woman Reading, oil on canvas, 1879-1884
 Woman Seated, oil, 1880, was in the collection of Mr. and Mrs. John D. Rockefeller III
 Woman with Book, oil

References

External links

 Susan Macdowell Eakins, Traditional Fine Arts Organization
 Artwork by Susan Macdowell Eakins in the Bryn Mawr College Art and Artifacts Collection

1851 births
1938 deaths
Pennsylvania Academy of the Fine Arts alumni
Artists from Philadelphia
American women painters
19th-century American painters
20th-century American painters
People associated with the Philadelphia Museum of Art
Burials at The Woodlands Cemetery
Students of Thomas Eakins
19th-century American women photographers
19th-century American photographers
20th-century American women photographers
20th-century American photographers
Painters from Pennsylvania
Photographers from Pennsylvania